Astathini is a tribe of longhorn beetles of the subfamily Lamiinae. It was described by Thomson in 1864.

Taxonomy
 Anastathes Gahan, 1901
 Astathes Newman, 1842
 Bacchisa Pascoe, 1866
 Chreomisis Breuning, 1956
 Cleonaria Thomson, 1864
 Eustathes Newman, 1842
 Hecphora Thomson, 1867
 Hispasthathes Breuning, 1956
 Lasiophrys Gahan, 1901
 Momisis Pascoe, 1867
 Mystacophorus Duvivier, 1891
 Ochrocesis Pascoe, 1867
 Parastathes Breuning, 1956
 Plaxomicrus Thomson, 1857
 Scapastathes Breuning, 1956
 Tropimetopa J. Thomson, 1864

References

 
Lamiinae